Carlos Yovani Palacios Montero (born 30 January 1982) is a Honduran footballer who plays for Motagua New Orleans as a left back.

Club career
Nicknamed Calolo, Palacios started his Liga Nacional career at Victoria and joined Real España in summer 2007. He then moved to Marathón in 2010 but was released in summer 2011.

In summer 2012 he signed for Real Sociedad after another season at Victoria.

International career
Palacios made his debut for Honduras in a June 2009 friendly match against Panama and has earned a total of 6 caps, scoring no goals. He has represented his country at the 2009 CONCACAF Gold Cup.

His final international was a July 2009 CONCACAF Gold Cup match against the USA.

Personal life
Palacios is a cousin of the three Palacios brothers: Jerry, Johnny and Wilson Palacios.

References

External links

Goal.com Profile

1982 births
Living people
People from Colón Department (Honduras)
Association football defenders
Honduran footballers
Honduras international footballers
2009 CONCACAF Gold Cup players
C.D. Victoria players
Real C.D. España players
C.D. Marathón players
C.D. Real Sociedad players
Motagua New Orleans players
Liga Nacional de Fútbol Profesional de Honduras players
Gulf Coast Premier League players